Babu may refer to:

Place 
 Babu District, in Hezhou, Guangxi, China

Title 
 Babu (title), South Asian term of respect (meaning 'boss' or 'father'), term also used to refer to Bureaucrats of various governments

People 

Babu (name), list of people with this name
 Babù (born 1980), Anderson Rodney de Oliveira, Brazilian footballer
 Babu (wrestling), ring name of Pablo Marquez, Ecuadorian wrestler
 DJ Babu (born 1974), Filipino-American DJ and member of Dilated Peoples

Media and culture 
 Babu (1971 film), a 1971 Tamil film starring Sivaji Ganesan
 Babu (1975 film), a 1975 Telugu film starring Shobhan Babu
 Babu (1985 film), a 1985 Hindi film starring Rajesh Khanna
 Babu (2001 film), a 2001 Urdu film starring Zeba Bakhtiar
 Hurree Chunder Mookerjee, character in the Rudyard Kipling novel Kim, mostly referred to as "Hurree Babu" or "the Babu"
 Babu, a fictional character from the 1973 animated television show Jeannie

Animals 
 Babu (red panda), which disappeared from a nature centre in Birmingham in 2005

See also 
 Baba (disambiguation)